Like many countries, several U.S. states have created sovereign wealth funds to finance certain services (typically public education) or to provide general revenue to the state government itself. This article comprises the known such funds and their monetary amounts.

Table

See also
 List of countries by sovereign wealth funds

References

External links
The Sovereign Wealth Fund Institute

 
Sovereign wealth funds